Zinclipscombite is a dark-green to brown zinc iron phosphate mineral with the formula Zn(Fe3+)2(PO4)2(OH)2. It occurs as fibrous spheres and exhibits tetragonal crystal structure.

In the classification of non-silicate minerals zinclipscombite is in the lipscombite group, which also includes lipscombite.

Discovery

The mineral zinclipscombite was discovered and named by Chukanov, Pekov, Möckel, Zadov, and Dubinchuk
 from a sample from the Silver Coin mine, Edna Mountain, Valmy, Humboldt County, Nevada, United States.  The new mineral name was approved in 2006 by the Commission on New Minerals and Mineral Names, International Mineralogical Association.

References

External links

Gallery of zinclipscombite pictures at mindat.org.

Zinc minerals
Iron(III) minerals
Phosphate minerals
Tetragonal minerals
Minerals in space group 96